Mule Creek is an unincorporated community in Grant County, New Mexico, United States. Mule Creek has a post office, with the ZIP code 88051.

Mule Creek is the location of Thorshof, the largest freestanding Heathen temple in the United States.

References

Unincorporated communities in New Mexico
Unincorporated communities in Grant County, New Mexico